The Tri-Cities, or Tri-City area, is a vernacular region that is situated between the large cities of Aurora and Elgin, Illinois, and encompasses the cities of Batavia, Geneva, and St. Charles.

A "vernacular region" is a distinctive area where the inhabitants collectively consider themselves interconnected by a shared history, mutual interests, and a common identity. Such regions are "intellectual inventions" and a form of shorthand to identify things, people, and places. Vernacular regions reflect a "sense of place," but rarely coincide with established jurisdictional borders.

The Tri-City area is primarily located in Kane County, though Batavia and St. Charles include parcels in DuPage County. The three communities are often grouped together due to their shared history, close proximity on the Fox River, relative socioeconomic condition, and similar population sizes. They are among the oldest in Kane County as well as the state, all having been incorporated long before Chicago, in whose metropolitan area the region is included.

History of the name
The name, "Tri-City" originated in 1910 with the publication of the first Tri-City Directory: Batavia, Geneva, St. Charles, by the Evans Directory Service of Elgin, Illinois. There were ten editions of the Tri-City Directory published from 1910 to 1943. During this same period, the local telephone directories served all three cities, as well.

There are other origin stories. In 2011, Batavia Mayor Jeffery D. Schielke has theorized that the Tri-City moniker originated in the early 20th century from the deviation of the railroad track between Aurora and Elgin to the three cities, which conductors nicknamed the Tri-Cities. Former St. Charles mayor Norris has theorized that the nickname grew in popularity during the 1940s and 1950s, when the area experienced a relative population boom and the boundaries of the cities began to move closer and closer together. Nowadays, the Tri-City area is bonded by retail and industrial corridors on Kirk and Randall Roads, joint policy decisions, area organizations, and the Fox River.

Historic places

 The Fabyan Windmill located in Geneva
 The Fabyan Villa in Geneva
 The Arcada Theater in St. Charles
 The historic Hotel Baker in downtown St. Charles.
 The Batavia Depot Museum in downtown Batavia.
 The Batavia Institute in Batavia, a former sanitarium where Mary Todd Lincoln stayed.
 The historic Campana Factory in Batavia.

Points of interest
 Fermi National Accelerator Laboratory in Batavia
 The Illinois Prairie Path and the Fox River Trail 
 The historic downtowns of Batavia, Geneva and St. Charles

Demographics
The following demographics represent an average of the three cities.

There were approximately 31,477 housing units in the Tri-City Area. The racial makeup of the area, on average, was 91.83% White, 1.80% Black or African American, 0.17% Native American, 2.40% Asian, 0.00% Pacific Islander, and 1.39% from two or more races. On average, Hispanic or Latino of any race were 7.30% of the population.

There were 30,666 households in the area. The average household size was 2.66.

In the city, the population was spread out, with 26.47% under the age of 18, and 11.63% who were 65 years of age or older.  The Tri-Cities are split fairly evenly between males and females, with a female population of 50.7%.

The average per capita income for the area was $42,575.  About 5.1% of the population was below the poverty line.

According to the 2008 U.S. Census Bureau estimate, the average median income for a household in the area was $87,861, the average median income for a family was $107,108 and the median home value was $290,567.

Major roads
 Illinois Route 64 
 Illinois Route 38 
 Illinois Route 25 
 Illinois Route 31 
 Randall Road
 Kirk Road/Dunham Road

Education

Colleges
There are no four-year institutions located in any of the Tri-Cities. Batavia had bid on being the host of Illinois State University but ultimately lost to Normal. The University of Illinois has a satellite office in St. Charles.

Nearby colleges include:
Aurora University in Aurora
Judson University in Elgin
Wheaton College in Wheaton
Northern Illinois University in DeKalb

Community colleges
Batavia and Geneva are both served by Waubonsee Community College. St. Charles is served by Elgin Community College.

Secondary schools
 Batavia High School
 Geneva Community High School
 St. Charles North High School
 St. Charles East High School
 West Aurora High School - serves the extreme southwestern side of Batavia

Neighboring communities
Aurora, Illinois
Elgin, Illinois
West Chicago, Illinois
Wayne, Illinois
Warrenville, Illinois
Bartlett, Illinois
North Aurora, Illinois
South Elgin, Illinois
Campton Hills, Illinois
Kaneland (Sugar Grove, Elburn, Kaneville, LaFox, Lily Lake, Maple Park)

Transportation
 Bus transportation serviced by Pace
 Nearest Metra train stations are located in Geneva, Aurora, and Elgin.

See also

Batavia, Illinois
Geneva, Illinois
St. Charles, Illinois
List of cities in Illinois
National Register of Historic Places listings in Kane County, Illinois

References

Metropolitan areas of Illinois
Cities in Kane County, Illinois
Cities in DuPage County, Illinois
Chicago metropolitan area